The Western Collegiate Hockey Association (WCHA) is a college athletic conference which operates in the Midwestern United States. It participates in the NCAA's Division I as a women's ice hockey-only conference. From 1951 to 1999, it operated as a men-only league, adding women's competition in the 1999–2000 season. It operated men's and women's leagues through the 2020–21 season; during this period, the men's WCHA expanded to include teams far removed from its traditional Midwestern base, with members in Alabama, Alaska, and Colorado at different times. The men's side of the league officially disbanded after seven members left to form the revived Central Collegiate Hockey Association (CCHA); the WCHA remains in operation as a women-only league.

WCHA member teams won a record 38 men's NCAA hockey championships, most recently in 2011 by the Minnesota–Duluth Bulldogs. A WCHA team also finished as the national runner-up a total of 28 times. WCHA teams also won the first 13 NCAA women's titles, which were first awarded in 2001.

History
The league was founded in 1951 as the Midwest Collegiate Hockey League (MCHL), then was known as the Western Intercollegiate Hockey League (WIHL) until 1958. The WIHL disbanded in 1958 after Minnesota and the three Michigan schools withdrew in protest of Colorado College, Denver and North Dakota recruiting overage Canadians. While this didn't violate NCAA rules, the four "M" schools felt it violated the spirit of intercollegiate athletics. The current Western Collegiate Hockey Association was founded for the 1959–60 season after the former WIHL schools concluded that the region needed a strong league. Despite this, Denver and Minnesota would not play each other until 1973, when the league took over scheduling from the individual members.  The 2005 NCAA Frozen Four hockey tournament finals were noteworthy when all four teams came from the WCHA.

WCHA teams also won the first 13 NCAA women's titles, which were first awarded in 2001. In 2006, WCHA member Wisconsin was the first school to capture both the men's and women's Division I ice hockey championships in the same season.

The men's regular season conference champion was awarded the MacNaughton Cup, while the league's tournament champion winning the WCHA Final Five took home the Broadmoor Trophy.

2013 realignment

On March 22, 2011, Minnesota and Wisconsin announced that their men's teams planned to leave the league in order to form a hockey Big Ten Conference in 2013–14, along with Penn State, which would start a varsity hockey program in 2012–13, and Central Collegiate Hockey Association members Michigan, Michigan State, and Ohio State.

In response to the creation of the Big Ten men's hockey conference, Denver, Colorado College, North Dakota, Nebraska-Omaha, Minnesota-Duluth, and St. Cloud State left the WCHA to join Miami University and Western Michigan of the CCHA to create the National Collegiate Hockey Conference. Facing membership at 4 teams for the 2013–14 season, the WCHA conference added one of its former members, Northern Michigan of the CCHA, on July 15, 2011.

On August 25, 2011, the WCHA announced that it had invited the University of Alaska Fairbanks, Bowling Green, Ferris State, and Lake Superior State to join beginning in the 2013–14 season. On August 26, 2011, Alaska-Fairbanks, Ferris State, and Lake Superior State accepted their invitations and joined Northern Michigan in the WCHA in 2013.  After much deliberation, on October 4, 2011, Bowling Green decided to join the WCHA as well in 2013.  On January 17, 2013, the WCHA admitted Alabama–Huntsville to the league, effective in the 2013–14 season.

This realignment activity only affected the men's side of the WCHA. Even after Penn State took the ice with both men's and women's teams, the Big Ten still had only four members with varsity women's hockey (Michigan and Michigan State field only men's teams). This meant that the women's side of the WCHA remained intact for the immediate future.

After realignment
The next change in the conference membership came shortly after the 2016–17 season, when North Dakota announced that it would drop women's hockey.

During the 2019 offseason, the future of the men's side of the WCHA fell into serious doubt when its seven Midwestern members—Bemidji State, Bowling Green, Ferris State, Lake Superior State, Michigan Tech, Minnesota State, and Northern Michigan—notified the WCHA that they would leave the league after the 2020–21 season, potentially forming a new men's hockey conference. In February 2020, these seven schools announced they would form a new CCHA.

At the time the seven Midwestern members announced their plans to leave, the two Alaska teams were facing a crisis following the veto by state governor Mike Dunleavy of over $100 million in funding for the University of Alaska system, a move that was seen as potentially ending intercollegiate athletics entirely at both the Anchorage and Fairbanks campuses. The cuts led the UA system to start the process of consolidating the three-campus system into a single accredited institution (though retaining the existing campuses), with the system president telling local media that a single accreditation would likely lead to the Anchorage and Fairbanks athletic programs being combined into a single program. While both campuses continued to sponsor men's ice hockey in the 2019–20 season, the future of at least one of the teams beyond that point was then seen as uncertain at best. Later developments saw many of the budget cuts pulled back, as well as a temporary halt to work on a single UA system accreditation; this led the UA system to announce that athletics at both campuses would continue as is through the 2020–21 school year.

In November 2019, Alabama–Huntsville submitted a withdrawal letter to the WCHA, stating that it also planned to leave after the 2020–21 season. At the time, UAH was discussing potential future options with the two Alaska campuses. However, UAH subsequently dropped hockey effective immediately on May 22, 2020, due to the financial impacts from the  COVID-19 pandemic on its athletic department.  On May 29, 2020, UAH President Darren Dawson announced that men's hockey would return for the 2020–21 season after more than $750,000 in private contributions were made in the week prior. This reprieve proved temporary, as the school and its hockey supporters agreed that the continuation of the sport beyond 2020–21 would be contingent on finding a new conference home; when no conference move materialized, the hockey program was dropped again (although UAH officially called it a "suspension").

In August 2020, Alaska Anchorage announced that it would drop hockey after the 2020–21 season. The University of Alaska Board of Regents offered the hockey team a chance at reinstatement in September if they could raise 2 seasons worth of expenses, approximately $3 million, by February 2021. The fundraising was divided into 2 parts: $1.5 million in cash, and the remainder in firm pledges. As of December 2020, the team had begun fundraising for the needed money. 

The men's WCHA would fold after the 2020–21 season, but the women's WCHA announced a further expansion effective in 2021–22 with the arrival of St. Thomas, a Twin Cities school that received NCAA approval to directly transition from Division III to Division I. St. Thomas had been expelled from its longtime D-III home of the Minnesota Intercollegiate Athletic Conference effective with the end of the 2020–21 school year due to perceptions by many members that it had grown too strong for that conference in multiple sports. The Summit League offered the Tommies a D-I home, and backed the school's bid to directly transition from D-III.

Members
The now women-only WCHA has 8 members following the 2021 arrival of St. Thomas. The men's side of the conference had 10 members in its final season of 2020–21, at which time only two schools, Bemidji State and Minnesota State, had both men's and women's teams in the conference.

Final men's members

Other former men's members

Former women's member

Membership timeline

Conference arenas

Awards (men's)
At the conclusion of each regular season schedule the coaches of each WCHA team vote which players they choose to be on the two to four All-Conference Teams: first team and second team with a rookie team added in 1990–91 and a third team added in 1995–96. Additionally they vote to award up to 5 individual trophies to an eligible player at the same time. The WCHA also awards a Most Valuable Player in Tournament, which is voted on at the conclusion of the conference tournament. Only the Coach of the Year award has been bestowed in each year of the WCHA's existence, making it the oldest continually-awarded conference award in Division I ice hockey.

All-Conference Teams

Individual Awards

Team Awards

National Championships

WCHA schools have won 37 NCAA Men's Ice Hockey National Championships.

<small>* Prior to 1959 the teams that formed the WCHA played in the MCHL or the WIHL.

WCHA schools have won 19 NCAA Women's Ice Hockey National Championships.

References

External links

 

 
College ice hockey conferences in the United States